"Stars" is a song by English indie dance trio Dubstar, released in 1995 as the debut single from their first album, Disgraceful (1995). It peaked at number 40 in the UK, but after being re-released in 1996, it was more successful, reaching number 15 on the UK Singles Chart and number 18 in Scotland, as well as number  69 on the Eurochart Hot 100. Outside Europe, the song was a hit in Israel, peaking at number-one for three weeks. It received a great deal of play time in clubs and many remixes were also created. There were produced three different music videos to promote the single. Italian metal band Lacuna Coil covered it on their 2000 EP Halflife.

Critical reception
AllMusic editor Kelvin Hayes called the song "sumptuous". Another editor, Jon O'Brien, described it as "ethereal" and "layered with shimmering synths to produce an achingly beautiful ballad". Pan-European magazine Music & Media commented, "Will dub make pop stars? If Portishead is the first band in that vein, then you might find the second here, though in a less ambient identity. The "sky edit" makes it a very average track though." A reviewer from Music Week rated it four out of five, writing, "The overt Pet Shop Boys overtones of Dubstar's debut can't detract from its gorgeous melody and lilting chorus. On this form, the duo are destined for great things." 

An editor, Martin Aston, added, "Its elegant and lush Euro-pop sound positions the band somewhere between Pet Shop Boys and St Etienne." On the 1996 re-release, a reviewer described it as "delightfully catchy". Daisy & Havoc from the RM Dance Update noted "the slightly Deacon Blue-ish pop original", stating that "the basic slightly trippy song and vocal is a nice piece of summer outdoor dancing-in-fields material (that is if we were allowed to do such wicked things) but it does have a tendency towards the Pet Shop Boys when housed up." Another editor, James Hamilton, declared it as a "Billie Ray Martin-ish melancholy bounder".

Track listing
 12", UK (1995)
"Stars" (Sky 12" Mix)
"Stars" (Search & Destroy Mix)
"Stars" (Way Out West Mix)
"Stars" (Mother Dub)
"Stars" (Original Mix)

 CD maxi, Europe (1995)
"Stars" (Original Mix) — 4:12
"Stars" (Sky Edit) — 4:32
"Stars" (Mother Dub) — 6:27
"Stars" (Search & Destroy Full Vox Mix) — 7:35
"Stars" (Sweet Tooths DJs Excursion) — 6:11

 CD single (The Mixes), Europe (1996)
"Stars" (Original Mix) — 4:12
"Stars" (Motiv 8 Radio Mix) — 3:57
"Stars" (Sonic Star Dub) — 9:47
"Stars" (Way Out West Mix) — 6:13

Charts

References

 1995 debut singles
 1995 songs
 1996 songs
EMI Records singles
Number-one singles in Israel
Polydor Records singles
Pop ballads
Synth-pop songs
Dubstar songs